This article lists the presidents of the Basque Parliament, the regional legislature of the Basque Country.

Presidents

Notes

References
 

 
Basque Country